Melica macra is a species of grass that can be found in Argentina, Brazil, and Uruguay.

Description

Distribution
In Argentina, it is found in such provinces as Buenos Aires, Catamarca, Corrientes, Entre Rios, Formosa, La Pampa, Misiones, Santiago del Estero, Tucumán, San Luis, and Santa Fe.

References

macra
Flora of Argentina
Flora of Brazil
Flora of Uruguay